Aphylax lyciformis is a species of beetle in the family Cerambycidae, the only species in the genus Aphylax.

References

Pteroplatini
Monotypic Cerambycidae genera